John Hoy (1 November 1885 – 30 October 1925) was a British wrestler. He competed in the men's freestyle lightweight at the 1908 Summer Olympics.

References

External links
 

1885 births
1925 deaths
British male sport wrestlers
Olympic wrestlers of Great Britain
Wrestlers at the 1908 Summer Olympics
Place of birth missing